The Atikamekw are the Indigenous inhabitants of the subnational country or territory they call  ('Our Land'), in the upper Saint-Maurice River valley of Quebec (about  north of Montreal), Canada. Their current population is around 8,000. They have a tradition of agriculture as well as fishing, hunting and gathering. They have close traditional ties with the Innu people, who were their historical allies against the Inuit.

The Atikamekw language, usually considered a variety of Cree in the Algonquian family, is closely related to that of the Innu. It is still in everyday use, being among the indigenous languages least threatened with extinction. Their traditional ways of life are endangered, however, as their homeland has largely been taken over by logging companies.

A small number of families make their living making traditional birch bark baskets and canoes.

Population

History

Early French historical documents begin to mention the Atikamekw at beginning of the 17th century, when they lived in the boreal forest of the upper Mauricie. In these early documents, the French colonists recorded the Atikamekw as "Atikamegouékhi", an effort to transliterate their name for themselves. The Atikamekw were described as a group of 500 to 600 people, who made up "one of the nations more considerable of the north". 

For food, they fished, hunted, and trapped. They supplemented their diet with agricultural products made and processed by women, such as corn and maple syrup. The latter was boiled to reduce as a syrup after sap was tapped from maple trees. Both men and women made tools from wood and animal parts, such as bone and tendon. The women made clothing from tanned animal hides. Tribal members traded with other native peoples in nearby areas, but trading networks connected along long distances. In summer, the Atikamekw would gather at places like Wemotaci. In the fall, they would pack for the winter season and disperse into smaller encampments through the boreal forest.

After the French entered the trading network, they introduced new, European manufactured goods, such as metal tools. The Atikamekw traded furs for such goods, becoming increasingly dependent on European goods in the fur trade. They were described as a peaceful people, sharing the region with the Innu (Montagnais) in the east, the Cree in the north, and Algonquin to the south. The Mohawk of the Iroquois Confederacy, whose five nations were based south of the Great Lakes, competed with them for the lucrative beaver trade and over hunting grounds. Through their Innu allies, the Atikamekw caught new infectious diseases that were endemic among the Europeans. Around 1670-1680, a smallpox epidemic devastated the Atikamekw tribe.

The French pulled the Atikamekw into a trade war between the Montagnais (Innu) and the Mohawk,  in which the Atikamekw and Innu did not fare well. Many of the Atikamekw who had survived the smallpox were killed by the more powerful Mohawk.

However, at the start of the 18th century, a group called "Tête-de-Boule" by the French reappeared in the region. While there exists no certainty as to the origin of this group, they may have been a regrouping of the few Atikamekw survivors and who were possibly associated with other indigenous nomadic tribes. But they are considered to be unrelated to the former Atikamekw even though they lived in the same area and took on the same name.

Today, the Atikamekw, like their historical allies the Innu, have suffered from mercury poisoning  due to contamination of their water supply by the operations of the central electric power companies before much environmental regulation.

Culture
The Atikamekw have their own traditional culture, language and rituals, though they had strong influences from the neighboring peoples.  From this grouping, three prominent communities developed. Each spoke the same language but with unique dialects. Members of the tribe as a whole generally speak the Atikamekw language, but the majority do not write it.

Traditionally, the Atikamekw lived in dome-shaped homes, which they created with branches and covered with bark called "piskokan". They covered the floor with spruce boughs, and used furs for beds and blankets. The Atikamekw preserved meat by smoking and drying it, a process still practiced by some families. Women collected berries and processed them into a paste that could be preserved for several weeks.

Ethnobotany
A full list of their ethnobotany can be found at http://naeb.brit.org/uses/tribes/8/ (74 documented plant uses). They chew the sap of Abies balsamea as a cold remedy, and use the boughs as mats for the tent floor.

Crafts

The making of hunting equipment (bows, snowshoes, sled dog) as well as clothing and blankets, was in former times a task necessary for survival. The Atikamekw developed a distinctive way to decorate their clothing. They covered ceremonial robes with bells made of bones emptied of the marrow.

The Atikamekw have been recognized for their skill in crafting birch bark items such as baskets and canoes, decorating the pieces with beautiful designs. These skills have been  transmitted from generation to generation. The Atikamekw are known as the "people of the bark" for their craft. The people of Obedjiwan make birch bark handicrafts less frequently than do other communities, since their environment in the boreal forest is dominated by conifer trees.

The seasons and the division of the year

The Atikamekw recognize six seasons in the year, each of which has a principal activity. The seasons begin with Sîkon, in late winter. The Atikamekw use this time to make bark baskets, which they can use to hold the maple-sap gathered in this time of year. After Sîkon is Mirôskamin, what European-Canadians would call Spring. In this season, the Atikamekw generally fished and hunted for partridge. These activities continue through Nîpin (Summer). 

During Takwâkin (autumn), the Atikamekw would go hunting for moose. A successful hunt required the careful removal of the skin of the moose, making offerings, and processing the meat for preservation through smoking and drying, for moose "jerky".  Women worked to make the hides usable: remove the hairs from the moose hide; soak, deflesh and tan the hide; and cut it into thin, flexible strips to weave netting for snowshoes. During the onset of winter, or Pîtcipipôn, the men would trap for beaver.  During the winter, or Pipôn, the men would make nets to fish under the ice, while others produce snowshoes.

In conjunction with the seasons, the Atikamekw divide the year into 12 months. The month names are based on the primary activity or observation of nature in that period.  The months are:

 Kenôsitc Pisimw – January: Longest [Winter] Moon
 Akokatcic Pisimw – February: Groundhog Emerges Moon
 Nikikw Pisimw – March: Otter Moon
 Kâ Wâsikatotc Pisimw – April: Reflects on the Ice Moon
 Wâpikon Pisimw – May: Flower Moon
 Otehimin Pisimw – June: Strawberry Moon
 Mikomin Pisimw – July: Raspberry Moon
 Otâtokon Pisimw – August: [Bird] Fledges Moon
 Kâkône Pisimw – September: Porcupine Mates Moon
 Namekosi Pisimw – October: Trout [Spawns] Moon
 Atikamekw Pisimw – November: Whitefish [Spawns] Moon
 Pîtcipipôn Pisimw – December: Winter Arrives Moon

Notable people 
 Constant Awashish, Grand Chief of the Atikamekw Nation
 Kwena Bellemare-Boivin, actress and musician
 Rykko Bellemare, actor and musician
 Cesar Newashish, canoe maker
 Jacques Newashish, actor, artist and filmmaker
 Laura Niquay, singer-songwriter
 Eva Ottawa, former Grand Chief of the Atikamekw Nation
 André Quitich, former Grand Chief of the Atikamekw Nation

References

External links

 Council of the Atikamekw Nation
Historica’s Heritage Minute video docudrama about “Maple Syrup.” (Adobe Flash Player.)
Declaration of sovereignty
Declaration of sovereignty (in French)
Dubé, Dollard, Légendes indiennes du St-Maurice, Les Pages trifluviennes, Série C —No. 3, 1933

 
Algonquian peoples
Indigenous peoples of the Subarctic
First Nations in Quebec
Algonquian ethnonyms